Financial Chronicle (FC) is an Indian English-language daily newspaper published since 2008. The newspaper primarily covers Indian economic and international business topics, and financial news and issues.

Edition
Financial Chronicle, edited by Shubhrangshu Roy, was simultaneously launched from Hyderabad and Chennai on 16 April 2008. The Bangalore edition was launched on 25 May, and the Mumbai edition on 20 June. With the launch of the New Delhi edition on 14 April 2009, Financial Chronicle completed its launch objective of five-city simultaneous publication within the first year itself. Financial Chronicle has had the shortest run-up to a newspaper launch in the history of Indian print journalism. It also has the record of reaching the maximum number of publication centres in the shortest span of time.

Financial Chronicles e-paper was launched midnight of 15–16 April 2008. This makes FC the first paper to be launched electronically on the internet before its print launch. FC began its journey five days-a-week, Monday through Friday. It launched a Weekend tabloid edition beginning 10 September 2011.

Financial Chronicle also publishes four weekly all-colour feature sections.

Format
Financial Chronicle is a business broadsheet printed in white newsprint in 20 pages format on Mondays, Tuesdays, Thursdays and Fridays and 16 pages format on Wednesdays. Its Weekend issue is published in 32 pages in tabloid format on Saturdays.

Management
The paper is owned by Deccan Chronicle Holdings Limited (listed on Bombay Stock Exchange and the National Stock Exchange). Its flagship publication is  Deccan Chronicle - an English daily  widely circulated in the state of Andhra Pradesh and the second largest English daily in Chennai. Deccan Chronicle is also published from Bangalore.

At launch, Financial Chronicle set up an editorial advisory board that included legendary agricultural scientist Dr M S Swaminathan, and eminent public personalities including, former telecom regulator Mr Nripendra Mishra, Mindtree founder Mr Subroto Bagchi and Lok Sabha MP Mr Sachin Pilot. Mr T Venkattram Reddy is Chairman of the company. FC was the first Indian business daily to have appointed an Ombudsman. Former Sebi chairman Mr M Damodaran was appointed as the first Ombudsman of the paper. Mr Shubhrangshu Roy is Chief Operating Officer and Editor-in-chief of Financial Chronicle.

Associate partner
Financial Chronicle had a tie-up with International Herald Tribune which published the IHT World Business with Reuters as a four-page daily add-on, incorporating international news, views, analyses and features. The association ended with the global withdrawal of International Herald Tribune as a newspaper brand and its replacement with the International New York Times.

References

Newspapers established in 2008
Newspapers published in Mumbai
English-language newspapers published in India
Daily newspapers published in India
Newspapers published in Kolkata
Business newspapers published in India
2008 establishments in Andhra Pradesh